Australian rules football in Victoria is the most watched code of football. Victoria has more than double the number of Australian rules football players of any other state in Australia (Soccer in Victoria is the only other football code with more participants).

The game's popularity in Victoria stems from its origins in Melbourne in the 1850s. Victoria is home to the Cordner–Eggleston Cup, the longest continuously running football competition in the world. It was home to the first official tournament in the sport, the Challenge Cup in 1861. It is home to the second oldest football league in Australia, the Victorian Football Association. It is also home to the oldest and most popular national football competition, the Australian Football League (AFL) which was a rebadge of Victoria's state competition, the Victorian Football League (VFL) from 1990. As such, the majority (10 of 18) teams participating in the AFL remain based in Victoria (in addition, two other Victorian clubs survive in the competition as relocated and merged entities). Since the renaming of the league, Victorian-based clubs have continued to dominate with around two thirds of the premierships.

The Melbourne Cricket Ground, with a capacity of 100,024 people (and has filled to over 120,000 in the past), is considered the "spiritual home" of the game, and is contracted to host the sport's largest event, the AFL Grand Final, annually until 2058 traditionally staged on the afternoon of the last Saturday in September. The state also holds regular blockbusters including the annual Anzac Day match, Queen's Birthday match and Dreamtime at the 'G.

The Victoria Australian rules football team has won more championships than any other state (until the introduction of State of Origin rules) winning 16 of the 19 carnivals up until 1975. Since other states were removed from contesting State of Origin, Victoria has been undefeated, having won against a combined rest of Australia team at home in both 2008 and 2020. Victorian teams have also dominated the National underage championships with two thirds of the titles since it went national in 1976. Victorian clubs have also won 10 of the 19 Championships of Australia.

Victoria has produced the most greats in the history of the game. All three of the Sport Australia Hall of Fame Australian Football legends are Victorian: Ron Barassi, Ted Whitten and Leigh Matthews. More than half of the Australian Football Hall of Fame Legends are from the state.

Victoria also holds the world record for attendance with 121,696 attending the 1970 VFL Grand Final between Carlton and Collingwood.

History
See also Origins of the Game, History of Australian rules football in Victoria (1859–1900)

Tom Wills began to devise Australian rules in Melbourne in 1858. (Although H.C.A. Harrison, Wills' cousin, was also named, much later, as an official father of the game his role does not, now, seem to have been significant at this very early stage.) A letter by Wills was published in Bell's Life in Victoria & Sporting Chronicle on 10 July 1858, calling for a "foot-ball club" with a "code of laws" to keep cricketers fit during winter. A match, played at the Richmond Paddock (later known as Yarra Park next to the MCG) on 31 July 1858, was probably a game of folk football, or one based on unidentified English school rules. However, few details of the match have survived.

The Melbourne Football Club was founded on Saturday 14 May 1859, one of the world's first football clubs in any code. For many years unjustified claims have been made about a football match between Melbourne Grammar School and Scotch College. It began on 7 August 1858, umpired by Wills and John McAdam. A second day of play took place on 21 August and a third, and final, day on 4 September. The two schools have competed annually ever since. However, the rules used by the two teams in 1858 had little in common with the eventual form of Australian football since that code had not yet been written.

The Melbourne Football Club rules of 1859 are the oldest surviving set of laws for Australian football. They were drawn up at the Parade Hotel, East Melbourne, on 17 May, by Wills, W. J. Hammersley, J. B. Thompson and Thomas Smith (some sources include H. C. A. Harrison). The 1859 rules did not include some elements that soon became important to the game, such as the requirement to bounce the ball while running, and Melbourne's game was not immediately adopted by neighbouring clubs. Before each match the rules had to be agreed by the two teams involved. By 1866, however, several other clubs had agreed to play by an updated version of Melbourne's rules.

First Organised Competitions

While many early Victorian teams participated in one-off matches, most had not yet formed clubs for regular competition until 1860. To ensure the supremacy of the Melbourne rules, the first-club level competition in Australia, the Caledonian Society's Challenge Cup (1861–64), stipulated that only the Melbourne rules were to be used. This law was reinforced by the Athletic Sports Committee (ASC), which ran a variation of the Challenge Cup in 1865–66. With input from other clubs, the rules underwent several minor revisions, establishing a uniform code known as "Victorian rules". In 1866, the "first distinctively Victorian rule", the running bounce, was formalised at a meeting of club delegates chaired by H. C. A. Harrison, an influential pioneer who took up football in 1859 at the invitation of Wills, his cousin.

VFA era

On 17 May 1877, the Victorian Football Association (VFA), Victoria's first governing body for Australian football, was formed. The foundation Senior clubs of the VFA were Albert-park, Carlton, Hotham, Melbourne, St Kilda.  The Junior section of the VFA originally included such clubs as Ballarat, East Melbourne, Essendon, Hawthorn, Northcote, South Melbourne, Standard, Victoria United, Victorian Railways, West Melbourne and Williamstown.  During its early years, many clubs dropped in and out and there were erratic promotions between the Senior and Junior sections.  Hawthorn, Northcote, Standard, Victoria United, Victorian Railways and Williamstown dropped out within a year or so but Hawthorn, Northcote and Williamstown were all to return at various times.

There were also numerous rules changes in this early period.

Growth outside of Melbourne
Not all football was played in Melbourne and the Goldfields experienced its own boom in competition in the 1880s and 1890s. By 1881, the Sandhurst Football Association had formed with a number of clubs in what is now Bendigo. Ballarat was to follow with its own Ballarat Football Association in 1893, giving some of the oldest clubs outside of Melbourne including Ballarat (1860) and Sandhurst (1861) clubs and the growing number of clubs in country Victoria some regular competition. While strong popular competitions in their own right, their member clubs were to become strong feeder clubs to the big metropolitan leagues.

Formation of the VFL
A rift in the VFA led to the formation of the Victorian Football League (VFL), which commenced play in 1897 as an eight-team breakaway of the stronger clubs in the VFA competition: Carlton, Collingwood, Essendon, Fitzroy, Geelong, Melbourne, St Kilda and South Melbourne. The first season concluded with Essendon finishing as the premiers (winners).

Another four VFA clubs joined the VFL later, as Richmond joined the VFL in 1908. Footscray, Hawthorn and North Melbourne joined in 1925, by which time VFL had become the most prominent league in the game. University also joined the VFL in 1908 but left in 1915.

National league and current issues

In 1982, in a move which heralded big changes within the sport, one of the original VFL clubs, South Melbourne Football Club, relocated to the rugby league stronghold of Sydney and became known as the Sydney Swans.

In the late 1980s, strong interstate interest in the VFL led to a more national competition; two more non-Victorian clubs, the West Coast Eagles and the Brisbane Bears began playing in 1987.

The league changed its name to the Australian Football League (AFL) following the 1989 season, later gaining further West Australian and South Australian teams.

The VFA/VFL became a secondary league, although even it has grown to accommodate a team from Tasmania.

Even the biggest locally grown suburban clubs, elevated into the national league, continue struggle for survival, competing for marketshare. Fourteen years after South Melbourne's difficulties led them to move to Sydney, similar problems at the Fitzroy Football Club result in a merger, forming the Brisbane Lions.  Although a small consolation of these club's recent success has been establishing renewed interest with their Melbourne based supporters, other clubs, such as the historic Melbourne, Western Bulldogs (formerly Footscray), North Melbourne and Carlton Clubs are assisted by the AFL to remain in the national competition. Many suggestions have been made in response to issues of overcrowding  but the AFL has been somewhat reluctant to make a drastic change, due to both the history and supporters' passion for their club – save for the merger of Fitzroy and the Bears.

Participation

In 2004, with 36,900 senior players in Victoria, more than any other state in Australia.

With a total participation of 223,999, Victoria has a participation rate of around 4% per capita, makes it the equal third most supported state (with Western Australia and South Australia)

Audience

Attendance record
 121,696 (1970).  VFL Grand Final Carlton v Collingwood (MCG, Melbourne)

Major Australian rules events in Victoria

Australian Football League Premiership Season including special matches: Anzac Day match, Dreamtime at the 'G and Queen's Birthday match
AFL Grand Final (annual)
Victorian Football League Grand Final (annual)
International Rules Series (biennial)
Australian Football International Cup (quadrennial free event)
E. J. Whitten Legends Game (annual charity event)
Community Cup (annual charity event)
Multicultural Cup (annual free event)
Ovens & Murray Football League Grand Final (annual)

Notable Victorian footballers
Australian Football Hall of Fame players with Legend status from Victoria (in order of induction) include: Ron Barassi, Haydn Bunton Sr., Roy Cazaly, John Coleman, Jack Dyer, Bill Hutchison, Leigh Matthews, John Nicholls, Bob Pratt, Dick Reynolds, Bob Skilton, Ted Whitten, Ian Stewart, Gordon Coventry, Kevin Bartlett, Jock McHale, Norm Smith, Kevin Murray, Tony Lockett, Kevin Sheedy and John Kennedy Sr.

Victorians represent the vast majority of male Australian Football Hall of Fame inductees.

Notable female players include: Debbie Lee (first female member of the Australian Football Hall of Fame), Daisy Pearce. Erin Phillips was born in Melbourne.

Governing body
The governing body for Australian rules football in Victoria is AFL Victoria.

Leagues and clubs

Professional clubs
Carlton Football Club (Australian Football League)
Collingwood Football Club (Australian Football League)
Essendon Football Club (Australian Football League)
Geelong Football Club (Australian Football League)
Hawthorn Football Club (Australian Football League)
Melbourne Football Club (Australian Football League)
North Melbourne Football Club (Australian Football League)
Richmond Football Club (Australian Football League)
St Kilda Football Club (Australian Football League)
Western Bulldogs (formerly Footscray Football Club) (Australian Football League)

Open

Statewide leagues
Victorian Football League

Melbourne metropolitan leagues

Eastern Football League 
Essendon District Football League 
Northern Football League 
Southern Football League 
Victorian Amateur Football Association
Western Region Football League

Regional leagues
Victorian Country Football League Official Site (governing body over regional Victoria)
Alberton Football League 
Ballarat Football League 
Bellarine Football League 
Bendigo Football League 
Central Highlands Football League 
Central Murray Football League
Colac & District Football League Official Site
East Gippsland Football League Official Site
Ellinbank & District Football League Official Site
Geelong Football League Official Site
Geelong & District Football League Official Site
Gippsland Football League Official Site
Goulburn Valley Football League
Golden Rivers Football League
Hampden Football Netball League Official Site
Heathcote District Football League Official Site
Horsham & District Football League Official Site
Kowree Naracoorte Tatiara Football League
Kyabram & District Football League 
Loddon Valley Football League Official Site
Maryborough Castlemaine District Football League Official Site
Mid Gippsland Football League Official Site
Millewa Football League Official Site
Mininera & District Football League Official Site
Mornington Peninsula Nepean Football League Official Site
Murray Football League Official Site
North Central Football League Official Site
North Gippsland Football League Official Site
Omeo & District Football League Official Site
Outer East Football Netball League
Ovens & King Football League Official Site
Ovens & Murray Football League 
Picola & District Football League 
South West District Football League Official Site
Sunraysia Football League Official Site
Tallangatta & District Football League Official Site
Upper Murray Football League Official Site
Warrnambool & District Football League Official Site
Wimmera Football League Official Site

Junior
Warragul & District Junior Football League
Riddell District Junior Football League Official Site
Yarra Junior Football League  
Waverley Junior Football Association Official Site
South Metro Junior Football League Official Site
Dandenong & District Junior Football League Official Site
Central Gippsland Junior Football League
Traralgon & District Junior Football League

Masters
Victorian Metropolitan Superules Football Official Site
Victorian Country Masters Australian Football Official Site

Women's
Victorian Women's Football League 
Youth Girls Competition Official Site

Principal venues

Representative team

The Victorian representative team is known as the Big V and have played State of Origin representative matches against all other Australian states.  However, since 1999 they have only played at Under 19 and state league level, with the senior professional team only making a once off appearance in the 2008 AFL Hall of Fame Tribute Match.

See also
Rugby league in New South Wales

References

Sources
 
 
 

 Australian Football League
 Football Victoria
 Opinion: Memo to AFL - Victoria needs you!

External links
Victoria Team of the Century (from Full Points Footy)

Victoria
Football in Victoria (Australia)
History of Australian rules football